Autumn MacDougall (born July 5, 1997) is a Canadian ice hockey forward,  playing in the Premier Hockey Federation (PHF) with the Montreal Force. She was selected fourteenth overall by the Buffalo Beauts in the 2020 NWHL Draft, becoming the first U Sports women's ice hockey player to ever be selected in a draft of the National Women's Hockey League (NWHL; renamed PHF in 2021).

Playing career   
MacDougall played college ice hockey with the Alberta Pandas ice hockey program in the Canada West conference of U Sports. Across five seasons with the program, she recorded 58 goals and 67 assists for 126 points in 139 regular season games. She finished as the sixth highest point leader in program history, winning the Canada West Championship twice and the national championship in 2017. 

She was drafted in the third round, 14th overall by Buffalo in the 2020 NWHL Draft. She signed her first professional contract with the team ahead of the 2020–21 NWHL season.

Career statistics

References

External links
 

1997 births
Living people
Alberta Pandas women's ice hockey players
Buffalo Beauts players
Canadian expatriate ice hockey players in the United States
Canadian women's ice hockey forwards
Ice hockey people from Nova Scotia
Sportspeople from Dartmouth, Nova Scotia